Sugioka (written: 杉岡) is a Japanese surname. Notable people with the surname include:

, Japanese footballer
, Japanese calligrapher and pedagogue
, Japanese high jumper

Japanese-language surnames